KOFO (1220 AM) is a radio station broadcasting a Country music format. Licensed to Ottawa, Kansas, United States. The station is currently owned by Brandy Communications.

References

External links
 

Country radio stations in the United States
OFO